CheMin, short for Chemistry and Mineralogy, is an instrument located in the interior of the Curiosity rover that is exploring the surface of Gale crater on Mars. David Blake, from NASA Ames Research Center, is the Principal Investigator.

CheMin identifies and quantifies the minerals present in rocks and soil delivered to it by the rover's robotic arm. By determining the mineralogy in rocks and soils, CheMin assesses the involvement of water in their formation, deposition, or alteration. In addition, CheMin data is useful in the search for potential mineral biosignatures, energy sources for life or indicators for past habitable environments.

CheMin aboard the Curiosity rover on Mars won the 2013 NASA Government Invention of the year award.

Description 

CheMin is an X-ray powder diffraction instrument that also has X-ray fluorescence capabilities. CheMin does not require the use of liquid reagents, instead, it utilizes a microfocus cobalt X-ray tube, a transmission sample cell and an energy-discriminating X-ray-sensitive CCD to produce simultaneous 2-D X-ray diffraction patterns and energy-dispersive histograms from powdered samples. Raw CCD frames are processed into data products on board the rover to reduce the data volume. These data products are transmitted to Earth for further processing analyses.

In operation, the collimated X-ray source produces and directs a beam through a transmission sample cell containing powdered material. A CCD (charge-coupled device) imager is positioned on the opposite side of the sample from the source and directly detects X-rays diffracted or fluoresced by the sample. The CCD can measure the charge generated by each photon, and hence its energy. Diffracted X-rays strike the detector and are identified by their energy, producing a two-dimensional image that constitutes the diffraction pattern of the sample. Both crystalline and amorphous materials can be analyzed in this fashion. 

A maximum of 65 mm3 of sample material is delivered to a vibrated funnel system that penetrates the rover deck, although only about 10 mm3 of material is required to fill the sample cell which is transparent with a disc-shaped volume, with an 8 mm diameter and 175 µm thickness. The funnel contains a 1 mm mesh screen to limit the particle size. Five permanent cells are loaded with calibration standards; these are single minerals or synthetic ceramic. Each analysis may take up to 10 hours, spread out over two or more Martian nights.

Features 
Capacity: CheMin is planned to analyze as many as 74 dry samples, but it is capable of analyzing many more because its sample cells can be emptied and reused for additional analyses. Cross-contamination by cell reuse is expected to be less than 5%. CheMin does not have the capability to store previously analyzed samples for later reanalysis.
Detection limits: able to detect individual minerals that are present at the 3% level and above.
Accuracy: for minerals that are present in concentrations of 12% and above, CheMin is able to state the absolute amount present ± 1.5%
Precision: 10%

Timeline 
On October 17, 2012 at "Rocknest", the first X-ray diffraction analysis of Martian soil was performed.  The results revealed the presence of several minerals, including feldspar, pyroxenes and olivine, and suggested that the Martian soil in the sample was similar to the "weathered basaltic soils" of Hawaiian volcanoes. The paragenetic tephra from a Hawaiian cinder cone has been mined to create Martian regolith simulant for researchers to use since 1998.

Typical results

See also 
Thermal and Evolved Gas Analyzer (Phoenix lander)
Urey instrument

References

External links 

Mars Science Laboratory instruments
Space science experiments